Kilmallock GAA is a Gaelic Athletic Association club located in the town of Kilmallock in County Limerick, Ireland.  The club is almost exclusively concerned with the game of hurling.

Honours

Hurling
Munster Senior Club Hurling Championship (3): 1992, 1994, 2014
Limerick Senior Hurling Championship (12): 1960, 1967, 1973, 1974, 1975, 1985, 1992, 1994, 2010, 2012, 2014, 2021.
Limerick Under-21 Hurling Championship (7): 2002, 2006, 2007, 2008, 2009, 2011, 2018
Limerick Minor Hurling Championship (11): 1972, 1973, 1987, 2000, 2001, 2002, 2004, 2005, 2006, 2009, 2010
Limerick Junior Hurling Championship (1): 2019

Football

Limerick Senior Football Championship (3): 1908, 1909, 1916

Notable hurlers
Dave Clarke
Mossie Dowling
Mike Houlihan
Barry Hennessy
Paudie O'Brien
Gavin O'Mahony 
Graeme Mulcahy (GAA Hurling All-Star recipient 2018)
Andrew O'Shaughnessy
Bryan O'Sullivan
Paddy O'Loughlin
Robbie Hanley
Aaron Costello

References

External links
Limerick GAA site
Kilmallock GAA Club on Facebook

Gaelic games clubs in County Limerick
Hurling clubs in County Limerick
Gaelic football clubs in County Limerick